Aghla Beg is a mountain in County Donegal, Ireland.

Geography 

The mountain is the third-most northern and fifth-highest of the mountain chain, called the Seven Sisters by locals: Muckish, Crocknalaragagh, Aghla Beg, Ardloughnabrackbaddy, Aghla More, Mackoght (also known as 'little Errigal') and Errigal. The Seven Sisters are part of the Derryveagh Mountains.

External links 
 Aghla Beg on MountainViews.ie

Marilyns of Ireland
Mountains and hills of County Donegal
Mountains under 1000 metres